The Last Will and Testament of Senhor da Silva Araújo (Portuguese: O Testamento do Senhor Napumoceno da Silva Araújo, Cape Verdean Creole (Badiu): U Testamentu du Sinhor Napumosenu da Silva Araúju) is a Capeverdean novel published in the Portuguese language in 1989 by Germano Almeida.  It mixes humor with cruel realism, sometimes pathetic, in a modern writing favoring the free indirect style.  The novel was adapted into a movie titled Napomuceno's Will in 1997 and was directed by Francisco Manso and starring Ana Firmino.

The book was first published on Ilhéu Editora.  Its first translation was in French and translated by Édouard Bailby by Éditions Sepia in 1995, it was later published in an English translation in 2004 by New Directions Publishing as The Last Will and Testament of Senhor da Silva Araújo.

Plot
The death of Senhor Napumoceno da da Silva Araújo, an illustrious merchant from Mindelo, the opening of the testament shows in surprises.  More than a will, it is 387 pages of memoirs, which shows the dead man's face, the vicissitudes of the dissolved life, has his secret daughter and its hatred of his nephew Carlos that deprived its expected heritage.

Publications
Ilhéu Editora, São Vicente, 1989 
French translation: Édouard Bailby, Sépia Publishers, Saint-Maur, 1995
Basque translation: Txalaparta, 2002, title: Napumoceno da Silva Araujo jaunaren testamentua
English translation: New Directions, 2004

References

External links
Text at sapo.pt 
Waberi, Abdourahman A. Le Cap-Vert de Germano Almeida. Fantasmes et tabous, Le Monde diplomatique, June 1996

Books by Germano Almeida
1989 novels
Cape Verdean novels
Novels set in Cape Verde
Mindelo
Literature of São Vicente